CUU may refer to:

 General Roberto Fierro Villalobos International Airport
 Cavendish University Uganda, a Ugandan university established in Kampala in 2008 
 Cursor Up (ANSI), an ANSI X3.64 escape sequence
 a codon for the amino acid leucine